Čačak, Čačak is the debut studio album by Yugoslav pop-folk singer Lepa Brena and her band Slatki Greh. It was released 3 February 1982 through the record label PGP-RTB.

This was Brena's first of twelve albums with Slatki Greh.

Background 
This is Brena's first album, after which she began her career and became the most popular singer in Yugoslavia. The most deserving of her media promotion was Milovan Ilic Minimaks. Since the appearance of Lepa Brena and Slatki Greh in the installation of the hit parade on Belgrade Television was thrown out because of the conditions, the scandalous and inappropriate dressing (Brena came to the recording in tight Bermudas, which she wore together with her mother), Minimaks on his own initiative in his author's broadcast, on the same television, inserted a recording of the performance of Brena's and Slatki Greh. She was until then only Brena, and he added the adjective Lepa, and announced it as a new Yugoslav star - Lepa Brena.

The album was sold in a circulation of 350,000 copies.

Track listing

Release history

References

1982 albums
Lepa Brena albums
PGP-RTB albums
Serbo-Croatian language albums